This List of ants of India is a list and index to the species of ants found in India.

A-D

E-L

M-R

S-Z

References
 Checklist of Indian ants
 T. C. Jerdon's ant lists
 Bingham, C. T.  1903. The Fauna of British India, including Ceylon and Burma. Hymenoptera 2. Ants and cuckoo-wasps. London. 506 pp. Browse or download the pdf here: 
 List of Ants India, Dr. Himender Bharti, Gary D. Alpert
 , India Ants, Dr. Himender Bharti
 , Ants of India, Dr. Himender Bharti

India
Ants
.A
India